Hore Wiremu "Gugi" Waaka (1 August 1937 – 5 July 2014), also known as Gugi Walker, was a New Zealand musical entertainer. A guitarist and singer, he was a founding member of the Quin Tikis and the Maori Volcanics Showband.

Biography
Of Ngāti Awa and Ngāti Pūkeko descent, Waaka was born on 1 August 1937. He grew up at Poroporo, near Whakatāne.

After serving in the air force in the late 1950s, Waaka began his show business career and was a founding member of the Quin Tikis. Moving to Australia, he formed in the Polynesian Trio with his brother and sister-in-law, Nuki and Mahora Waaka, in 1961. The trio then joined with Matti Kemp, John Clarke and Hector Epae, forming the Maori Volcanics Showband in 1964. Waaka left the band after a few months following a minor disagreement with Nuki.

Waaka was a member of a number of other show bands, including the Maori Premiers and the New Zealand Impacts Showband, and formed the eponymous Gugi Walker Quartet.

Between 2002 and 2007 Waaka performed at the annual Aotearoa Māori Sports Awards, providing post-awards entertainment.

Following his death from heart problems on 5 July 2014, Waaka's body lay in state at Papakura Marae.

References 

1937 births
2014 deaths
Ngāti Awa people
People from Whakatāne
20th-century New Zealand male singers
New Zealand guitarists
New Zealand male guitarists
New Zealand expatriates in Australia